Alan Frank Scott (5 July 1939 – 15 July 2018 was an Australian rugby league footballer who played in the 1960s.

Playing career
Scott was graded from the Alexandria Rovers club in 1959. He played first grade for South Sydney in 1960, but accepted a contract with Manly-Warringah in 1961 and played with them for three seasons between 1962-1964. 

He returned to South Sydney in 1965 and stayed until 1969.  He won a premiership with Souths, playing second row in the 1967 Grand Final.

References

Manly Warringah Sea Eagles players
South Sydney Rabbitohs players
2018 deaths
Australian rugby league players
Rugby league second-rows
1939 births